Pyramoides is a genus of beetles in the family Carabidae, containing the following species:

 Pyramoides crassicornis (Putzeys, 1846)
 Pyramoides oblongicollis (Putzeys, 1861)

References

Scaritinae